Robert Koenig may refer to:
Robert Koenig (filmmaker) (born 1975), American filmmaker
Robert Koenig (sculptor) (born 1951), English sculptor
Robert König (1885–1979), Austrian mathematician